Rosora is a comune (municipality) in the Province of Ancona in the Italian region Marche, located about  southwest of Ancona. 

Rosora borders the following municipalities: Arcevia, Castelplanio, Cupramontana, Maiolati Spontini, Mergo, Montecarotto, Poggio San Marcello.

History
The origins of Rosora are connected to the Lombards, who built here a castrum (castle), probably over a pre-existing Roman structure. In the Middle Ages it was a commune, later annexed to that of Jesi. It was under the Papal States until 1860, when it became part of the Kingdom of Italy.

Main sights
Castle, with a 15th-century tower, part of the walls and tunnels from the primitive building.

References

External links
 Official website

Cities and towns in the Marche